William George Cameron (September 25, 1853 – October 29, 1930) was a Canadian politician. He served in the Legislative Assembly of British Columbia from 1903 to 1907  from the electoral district of Victoria City, as a Liberal.

References

British Columbia Liberal Party MLAs
People from Calaveras County, California
Politicians from Victoria, British Columbia
American emigrants to Canada
1853 births
1930 deaths